Mohammed Yaqub (born 7 January 1994) is a Scottish former professional footballer who last played at the senior level for Cowdenbeath, as a left back.

He also represented Scotland at youth levels up to under-17.

Career
Yaqub moved from Celtic to St Mirren in July 2012. He made his senior debut on 18 May 2013, in the Scottish Premier League.

On 28 May 2013, he signed a new one-year deal with St Mirren, until the end of the 2013–14 season. Despite not playing a single game for the first team during season 2013–14, Yaqub signed another one-year deal on 27 May 2014.

Having failed to break into the first team, and with the club suffering relegation, Yaqub was released by St Mirren on 29 May 2015.

On 15 July 2015, Yaqub signed for Cowdenbeath. Following Cowden's relegation at the end of the 2015–16 season, he did not play again for that club or any other in the SPFL.

Career statistics

See also
Scottish Asian
British Asians in association football

References

1994 births
Living people
Scottish footballers
Celtic F.C. players
St Mirren F.C. players
Cowdenbeath F.C. players
Scottish Premier League players
Scottish Professional Football League players
Scottish people of Asian descent
Association football fullbacks
Scotland youth international footballers
Footballers from Glasgow